Carma Ryanne Gorman (born January 1969) is an American art historian known for her work in the area of design history. Her American Quarterly article "Educating the eye: Body mechanics and streamlining in the United States, 1925-1950" was one of ten reprinted in the Organization of American Historians' anthology The Best American History Essays 2008.

Early life and education
Carma Gorman was born in January 1969. She earned her BA in art history at Carleton College in 1991 and her MA and PhD in the history of art at the University of California, Berkeley in 1994 and 1998 respectively.

Career
Gorman was an assistant professor and associate professor at Southern Illinois University from 1998 to 2013. Since 2013 she has been associate professor and then assistant chair in the history of design at the University of Texas at Austin.

She is a member of the board of directors of the College Art Association, an associate editor of the academic journal Design and Culture, and a past president of the Design Studies Forum.

Selected publications
 "An Educated Demand:" The Implications of Art in Every Day Life for American Industrial Design, 1925–1950", Design Issues, Vol. 16, No. 3, pp. 45–66.
 The Industrial Design Reader. Allworth Press, New York, 2003. (Editor)  
 "Educating the eye: Body mechanics and streamlining in the United States, 1925-1950", American Quarterly, Vol. 58, No. 3, pp. 839–868.
 Objects, Audiences, and Literatures: Alternative Narratives in the History of Design. Cambridge Scholars, Newcastle, 2007. (Edited with David Seth Raizman) 
 "The Role of Trademark Law in the History of US Visual Identity Design, c.1860–1960", Journal of Design History, Vol. 30, Issue 4 (November 2017), pp. 371–388. https://doi.org/10.1093/jdh/epx024

References

External links 
http://utexas.academia.edu/CarmaGorman

Living people
1969 births
University of Texas at Austin faculty
Women art historians
American women academics
21st-century American women
Carleton College alumni
University of California, Berkeley alumni
Southern Illinois University faculty
Design writers
American women historians
American art historians